Fallout Online is a cancelled massively multiplayer online game (MMO) set in the Fallout universe that was being developed by Masthead Studios and was to be published by Interplay, with members of the Interplay team providing creative control and design. Chris Taylor and Mark O'Green, two of the creators of the original Fallout, were among the developers; Jason Anderson, one of the other makers of Fallout, was involved in the project between 2007 and 2009, but then left the team. Interplay's rights to develop and publish this game have been the subject of legal disputes between Interplay and Bethesda Softworks, the current owner of the Fallout franchise. An out-of-court settlement was reached in 2012 as Bethesda received full rights to the Fallout online game for two million dollars, eventually releasing its own online game, Fallout 76, six years later.

Development 
According to Interplay, they had created a large and multi-part "game-worldwide meta-puzzle". This meta-puzzle includes the puzzle structure, code system, and planned locations, which is designed to foster cooperation and competition among players for an extended time period. Several game zones had been blocked out with textured and populated 3D objects. The initial starting zones for each player character race have also been designed, making it so that each character of a different race has a different story to start with. Computer models for many types of creatures had been designed and the 3D geometry and textures created and some NPCs have been created to live in the game. Fallout Online combat, leveling, character development, item crafting, skills have been written and tested. Interplay has revealed that it has created player-run towns (towns controlled by players), guild centers and social centers for players to interact in.

Black Isle Studios 
According to Feargus Urquhart, when Brian Fargo was still the president of Interplay, Fargo proposed a possible Fallout MMO to be made by Black Isle, but Urquhart refused, saying, "The reason at the time, because I would have loved to have made a Fallout MMO, was that I believed that Interplay was just not in a situation where they had the resources to do it. When you go off to do an MMO it's going to cost $100 million before you get it on the shelf; you've gotta buy servers and you've gotta have service people, and you have to have Game Masters. It's an undertaking, and on top of that, it means that you do have to do all that stuff so what else are you going to focus on? What other games are you going to be able to make?"

Interplay — Masthead Project 
In November 2006, Interplay, headed by Herve Caen, filed a Form 8-K filing to the United States Securities and Exchange Commission (SEC) regarding a potential Fallout massively multiplayer online game. In April 2007, Bethesda Softworks, the developer of Fallout 3, purchased full rights to the Fallout IP for US$5.75 million. While Bethesda now owned the rights to the Fallout MMO IP as well, clauses in the purchase agreement allowed Interplay to license the rights to the development of the MMO. Specific requirements were stated in the agreement that if not met, Interplay would immediately lose and surrender its license rights for Fallout. Development must have begun within 24 months of the date of the agreement (April 4, 2007), and Interplay must have secured $30 million within that time frame or forfeit its rights to license. Interplay would furthermore need to launch the MMOG within four years of the beginning of development, and pay Bethesda 12 percent of sales and subscription fees for the use of the IP.

On August 1, 2007, ZeniMax Media Inc., parent company of Bethesda Softworks, announced the creation of ZeniMax Online Studios. The division would be headed by Matt Firor, a well-known expert in the field of online gaming, and would focus on the massively multiplayer online game (MMO) market segment. It might work on a Fallout MMO in the future, if Interplay fails to gather enough money for their Fallout Online project.

In November 2007, Interplay reopened in-house development and hired Fallout developer Jason D. Anderson as creative director for an unannounced MMO. Given the aforementioned facts, it is most likely that the game Anderson was working on is Interplay's Fallout MMO, given that he was the contact name of Interplay's jobs appliance and that Fallout was referred in the job requirements. In March 2009, Anderson left Interplay and joined InXile Entertainment.

On June 30, 2008, it was announced that Interactive Game Group, LLC (created by Frederic Chesnais, former CEO of Atari, which now also owns MicroProse) purchased 2,000,000 shares of Interplay stock, as consideration for entering into a game production agreement, likely related to Fallout Online.

On April 2, 2009 Interplay announced a binding letter of intent with Masthead Studios, a Bulgarian-based developer, to fund the development of Project V13. Masthead and Interplay teams would work together under the direction and control of Interplay to complete development of the project. On June 15, 2010, the game was officially announced as Fallout Online. The game was planned to be co-developed between Interplay and Masthead Studios, and to use Masthead's Earthrise Engine, used on Masthead's first game, Earthrise.

Legal dispute and cancellation 
On April 15, 2009, Bethesda Softworks announced a move to rescind the Fallout MMO license. Interplay received notice from Bethesda that it intended to terminate the trademark license agreement, claiming that Interplay was in breach of the agreement for failure to commence full scale development by April 4, 2009 and to secure certain funding for the game. Interplay disputed these claims. On July 15, 2009, "Project V13" developer Chris Taylor posted a reply on the Interplay website "Project V13" Forum thread refuting the claims that Interplay lost the rights to the Fallout MMO.

On September 8, 2009 Bethesda filed a copyright infringement lawsuit against Interplay in the Maryland District Court. Bethesda claimed that Interplay had only licensed the Fallout name to use for their game and could not use any of its assets. Interplay counteracted this claim by stating that they did not license the name to make an online poker game titled Fallout. They stated that what Bethesda was claiming was comparable to having a Snow White movie and the princess not appearing in it at all. Interplay further stated that if Bethesda refuses to let them complete Fallout Online, then they will be able to release only one more Fallout IP with its DLCs before the rights revert to Interplay, a notion that will give Interplay the full rights to Fallout Online and the rest of the Fallout series. Interplay won the injunction resulting in Bethesda calling for an appeal. It was then revealed that prior to April 9, 2009 Interplay had employed game designers, writers, and artists who had substantially completed the Fallout Online game design, including an online wiki dedicated to the game's development, which when printed and produced to Bethesda's counsel as it existed on April 4, 2009 consisted of nearly 2,200 pages. Prior to April 4, 2009, Interplay had created substantial concept art, solidified its technology plan by licensing a game engine and development tools set from Masthead Studios that would have cost Interplay millions of dollars to develop from scratch. A playable game space also existed, based on Interplay's concept art and developed by Masthead and multiple users from Europe and the U.S. could log into and interact within the game. For the game, Masthead was tasked with  revising and improving its technology, including its game engine, tools and network software. On December 10, 2009 the court denied Bethesda's request for preliminary injunction. Interplay was able to continue development on the project until the case was resolved.

Bethesda then sued Masthead Studios and asked for a preliminary injunction against the company. The Court denied Bethesda's motion before Masthead Studios had even had an opportunity to file a response in opposition. Bethesda's attempt to appeal the unfavorable decision was quickly denied. Bethesda later filed a motion in limine against Interplay in an attempt to suppress evidence that would have supported Interplay at trial, namely that Interplay had satisfied the conditions of the original contract. In response, Interplay filed its own motion in limine the day after in an attempt to prevent Bethesda from producing a formally undisclosed expert witness, who was expected to offer expert testimony regarding the meaning of contract terms contained in the Trademark License Agreement. The jury trial requested by Bethesda was canceled due to the language of the APA contract (contract that sold Fallout to Bethesda), which stated that all legal disputes could only be resolved by a bench trial, leaving the outcome of the case in the hands of a single judge. It is unknown if this was a simple oversight by Bethesda or something brought to the court's attention by Interplay.

Per an out of court settlement, Fallout Online was cancelled. However, Interplay through its Black Isle division continues to work on Project V13 but will remove any and all references to Fallout to honor the settlement. The terms of the settlement forced Interplay to surrender to Bethesda all property pertaining to the Fallout MMO. Interplay was still able to sell copies of  Fallout, Fallout 2 and Fallout Tactics: Brotherhood of Steel, but its permission to do so ended on December 31, 2013. Bethesda's own Fallout MMO game, Fallout 76, was released in 2018.

References

External links 
 Official website (archived)
Project V13/Fallout Online the Nukapedia Fallout wiki
 Project V13/Fallout Online Portal the Vault Fallout wiki

Fallout (series) video games
Cancelled Windows games
Massively multiplayer online role-playing games
Video games developed in Bulgaria
Video games developed in the United States